A. and B. v EHB and C. [1997] IEHC 176, commonly known as the C Case, was a legal case in Ireland on whether a thirteen-year-old girl (known as C) who had become pregnant as a result of rape and was suicidal could be permitted to travel abroad to obtain an abortion. She was in the care of the Eastern Health Board (EHB), an organ of the Irish state, and the abortion was resisted by her parents, the plaintiffs in the case.  Abortion law in Ireland at the time of the case made abortion inaccessible within Ireland; however, in the X Case (1992), the Supreme Court had ruled that abortion was permissible under the Constitution where there was a threat to a woman's life, including a risk of suicide.

Facts
Ms. C was brutally raped by an adult male (Simon McGinley) on 27 August 1997, and became pregnant as a result. She is a member of the travelling community and one of a family of twelve. The rapist is also of the travelling community and a long-standing friend of the family. The evidence before the District Court indicated that she lived in particularly squalid conditions which were quite unlike the conditions in which most travelling people lived. The Court believed that the girl was very severely traumatised by the rape. The girl was currently in the care of the Irish state. She became suicidal and the EHB made a court application to bring her to the UK for an abortion.

She had an abortion in the UK in December 1997, accompanied by two officers from the Garda Síochána and her EHB guardian.

The parents were opposed to the abortion, and communicated regularly with Youth Defence.

The rapist, Simon McGinley, was jailed for 12 years.

Law
Abortion was illegal in Ireland at the time of the case. It was prohibited under sections 58 and 59 of the Offences against the Person Act 1861, and Article 40.3.3° of the Constitution of Ireland protected the right to life of the unborn. The substantive clause was added by the Eighth Amendment of the Constitution of Ireland in 1983. A further clause was added by the Thirteenth Amendment in 1992 in response to the X Case, protecting the freedom to travel to another state to obtain an abortion.

A referendum to replace Article 40.3.3° with a permissive clause allowing legislation by the Oireachtas was passed in May 2018 and was signed into law in September 2018. The specific legislation regulating abortions, the Health (Regulation of Termination of Pregnancy) Act 2018, was enacted in December 2018. Abortion services began on 1 January 2019.

Court case
On 21 November 1997, the District Court made an order that C could leave the country. The parents challenged this order in the High Court, but the court upheld the original order, allowing the EHB to bring her to the UK for an abortion. The court relied on the judgment in the X Case and the Thirteenth Amendment of the Constitution of Ireland.

Reaction
The then Roman Catholic Archbishop of Dublin, Desmond Connell, strongly criticised the ruling; however, he declined to fund a Supreme Court challenge.

Archbishop Connell claimed that abortion caused mental health problems:

Youth Defence picketed the home of EHB Chair Róisín Shortall because she did not stop the case.

The Pro Life Campaign criticised the EHB, and called for a full inquiry.

Legacy
The woman at the centre of the case has occasionally spoken about her experiences, but not revealed her identity. She found the abortion traumatic, and did not understand what was going on at the time. She did not know that she would be getting an abortion, and thought that the hospital was going to deliver her baby.  She eventually named and sought a death certificate for the aborted child. She has expressed that she wishes the child would have been put up for adoption. She made numerous attempts on her own life following the procedure, but eventually gave birth to a son who helps keep her mentally stable.

In 2009, the rapist was sentenced to 21 years for another rape, this time of an 86-year-old woman in 2008.

See also
 Miss D
 Ms Y

References

1997 in the Republic of Ireland
Abortion in the Republic of Ireland
Republic of Ireland abortion case law
Political scandals in the Republic of Ireland
November 1997 events in Europe